New Windsor College was the name of two colleges located in New Windsor, Maryland. The first existed from 1843 until 1851.  The old location of that college was taken over by Calvert College.

After Calvert College closed in 1873 a new New Windsor College was formed on the same site by Presbyterian in 1876.  The school had its first college graduate in 1881.  Through 1894 there were a total of 35 people who received bachelor's degrees from the institution.  By the 1890s the school consisted of New Windsor College which granted bachelor's degrees to men, Windsor Business College, and Windsor Female College, which was a finishing school granting the degree of mistress of polite literature.  It was taken over by Blue Ridge College in 1912.

References

Educational institutions established in 1876
Defunct private universities and colleges in Maryland
New Windsor, Maryland
1876 establishments in Maryland
1912 disestablishments in Maryland
Educational institutions disestablished in 1912
Educational institutions established in 1843
1843 establishments in Maryland
Educational institutions disestablished in 1851
1851 disestablishments in Maryland